William Glenn Sloan (August 21, 1888 - August 13, 1987) was an American inventor and scientist who was co-author of Pick-Sloan Missouri Basin Program to dam the upper Missouri River.

Sloan was born in Paris, Illinois.  His father, a Presbyterian minister moved to Helena, Montana in 1910.  He graduated from Montana State College with a bachelor of science in civil engineering in 1910.

He joined the United States Department of Agriculture and a drainage engineer in Idaho in 1910.  During World War I he was a lieutenant in the Army Corps of Engineers.

After the war, he was a private consultant on irrigation engineering until 1936, when he joined United States Bureau of Reclamation first in the Rio Grande Valley.

The plan was to be in conjunction with the United States Army Corps of Engineers proposed by Lewis A. Pick to build dams on Missouri to alleviate flooding and improve navigation (known as the "Pick Plan")

The two plans which became known as the Pick-Sloan Missouri Basin Program were initially enacted in the Flood Control Act of 1944.  It was to result in a series of dams on Upper Missouri as well as its tributaries which among other things generate 2.5 million kilowatts of electricity.

Among his other accomplishment is a patent on the airlift pump

References

1888 births
1987 deaths
People from Paris, Illinois
People from Helena, Montana
Montana State University alumni
United States Bureau of Reclamation personnel